Gog may refer to:

Religion
 Gog and Magog, entities from various religious texts

People
 Anikó Góg, Hungarian triathlete
 GOG or Genival Oliveira Gonçalves (born 1965), Brazilian rapper
 Gog, a slang term for a person from North Wales

Places
 Gog (woreda), a district in Gambela, Ethiopia
 Gog, an archaic spelling of the town of Goch, North Rhine-Westphalia, Germany
 Gog Magog Hills, a hill range south of Cambridge, England, colloquially known as 'The Gogs' 
 Gog and Magog, twin rock formations in Stewart Island / Rakiura, New Zealand
 Goodview Garden stop, a light rail stop in Hong Kong (MTR station code GOG)

Fiction
 Gog (DC Comics), a DC Comics super-villain
 Gog (film), a 1954 3-D science fiction film by Herbert L. Strock
 Gog (Marvel Comics), a Marvel Comics super-villain and monster
 Gog (novel), a 1931 satire by Giovanni Papini
 Gog, a 1967 novel by Andrew Sinclair
 Gog and Magog ("Gos et Magos"), characters in the 16th century novels Gargantua and Pantagruel
 Gogs, an animated UK television series
 Guardians of Ga'Hoole, a New York Times best-selling book series

Other uses
 Gog (trilobite), a genus of trilobite
 Gog and Magog (statues), of Guildhall, London
 GOG.com (formerly Good Old Games), a videogame website
 GOG Håndbold, a Danish handball club
 Gynecologic Oncology Group, a non-profit organization researching gynecological cancers
 Giovine Orchestra Genovese, music organization, concert society and cultural association, based in Genoa, Italy
 Oaks of Albion, a pair of oak trees in Glastonbury, Somerset, England, known individually as Gog and Magog

See also
 Gogg, a character in the 1993 television series Cro